Ross Spur Services is a southbound-only service area on the A449 at the end of the M50 motorway. Formerly operated by BP, it is now owned by Euro Garages and was planning to be expanding to incorporate drive-through restaurants with a seating area and a shop. A Starbucks was added with a drive through but the Burger King was not added at the time.

History
Welcome Break sold the services in 2001, and from 2001 to 2012 the services were derelict with nothing more than a BP and a Spar.

When Euro Garages finally bought the site in 2011, the services were planned to expanded to form a fairly large service area and to expand Euro Garages' network of sites as they only operated one motorway service area at the time. The services were fully built by 2012.

In 2013, a Starbucks was added and, at the time, was one of the only Starbucks 'Drive-Thru's in the country.

In early 2014, some of the Spar store changed into a Greggs, adding a new facility to the services.

In late 2014, parking regulations at the site changed. There was a charge for parking over 2 hours without a ticket.

In 2015, there was construction for 6 weeks near the services. Once the construction was finished, there was a pavement alongside the A449 dual carriageway road from the service car park into Ross-on-Wye.

By 2016, all parking machines had been removed at the services and customers who wanted to stay for more than 2 hours could let a member of staff know about it with no charge, either at Starbucks or the Spar kiosk.

In early 2018, the Starbucks was temporarily open 24 hours, like the Spar. Soon after, as not many people visited between the evening and the morning, the opening times reverted to its old state.

In late 2018, the petrol station switched from BP to Esso, after being with BP for nearly 18 years.

In late 2019, building work has started at the services between the Spar and the Starbucks. According to staff, it could be a Burger King.

Construction
Construction of the service station started in 2011 and was finished in mid-2012. The original service area was constructed between 1965 and 1966.

Layout
The Service Area consists of two buildings. The first is a Starbucks with outside seating and the second is a Spar with a Subway and a Greggs, that was more recently constructed.

Facilities
Greggs;
Subway;
Starbucks;
Spar;
Esso.

References

M50 motorway service stations